= T. Arthur Plummer =

American writer

Michael Sarne (1883–1961) was an American writer who, under the pen name Thomas Arthur Plummer, was a popular crime fiction and mystery writer of the 1930s.

His main series character was Inspector Andrew Frampton.
